Black Widow is a 2007 television film directed by Armand Mastroianni and starring Elizabeth Berkley, Alicia Coppola and Adriana DeMeo. Produced by RHI Entertainment, it is loosely based on the 1987 film of the same name starring Debra Winger and Theresa Russell.

Black Widow stars Elizabeth Berkley, Randall Batinkoff, and Adriana DeMeo.

The film was originally released in 2007, before being re-cut and re-released in 2008 under the title Dark Beauty.

Plot
Olivia, is young, beautiful, brilliant, and effortlessly charming. She is a dedicated charity worker, responsible for establishing free clinics across the country for poor women. When she meets millionaire Danny Keegan, the pair soon form a relationship and he falls for her. However, it soon becomes clear that not everyone admires Olivia. Danny’s college friend, Melanie, a photo journalist for the Los Angeles Post, thinks that there is something suspicious about Olivia and soon wants to learn more about the mysterious woman.

With the help of her assistant, Finn, Melanie discovers the truth about Olivia, finding out that her Ph.D. is fake, that she is responsible for many acts of embezzlement and that she has another lover on the side. Then she discovers Olivia’s numerous identities, the multiple marriages that have left her very rich, and the suspicious deaths of each of her husbands. Soon enough, Olivia realizes that Melanie is on to her and begins to take action against her. She will do anything to protect herself, even if it comes to murder.

In the end, after much difficulty, Melanie manages to expose Olivia as the evil woman she truly is to everyone, including Danny, and Olivia gets her well-earned comeuppance when the arriving police shoot her to death after Olivia mindlessly attempts to shoot them. Afterwards, Melanie successfully publishes Olivia's story for the Los Angeles Post, and she and Danny begin to start a friendship.

Cast
Elizabeth Berkley as Olivia Whitfield / Grace Miller
Alicia Coppola as 'Mel' Melanie Dempsey
Adriana DeMeo as Finn Driver
Randall Batinkoff as Danny Keegan
Barbara Niven as Tiffany Collins
Tembi Locke as Jill Keegan
Joel Anderson as Cooper Collins
Brady Smith as Lucas Miller
David Ury as Edward Bixler
Jeremy Howard as Henry
Steve Monroe as Matty Keegan
George Wyner as Stan Driver
Chris Farah as Receptionist 
Carla Jimenez as Rosa
Jim Palmer as Detective Harris

Reception
David Nusair, writing for Reel Film Reviews said that the film is, "Salacious enough to ensure that boredom never entirely sets in."

References

External links
 
 Black Widow full movie on Youtube

2007 television films
2007 films
2007 crime thriller films
Lifetime (TV network) films
Films set in Los Angeles
American serial killer films
Sonar Entertainment films
Larry Levinson Productions
Films directed by Armand Mastroianni
2000s American films